Home Again! is the fourth studio album American folk music artist Doc Watson, released in 1966.

Two of the songs were co-written with fiddler Gaither Carlton, Doc's father-in-law.

Reception

Writing for Allmusic, music critic Bruce Eder called the album "his most affecting folk-style record, with unexpectedly warm vocals matched to the quiet virtuosity of his playing... This album was a great showcase for Watson's voice — vaguely similar to but rougher-hewn than Burl Ives — which is often overlooked in the aura of his playing."

Track listing
 "Down in the Valley to Pray" (Traditional) – 2:01
 "Georgie" (Gaither Carlton, Doc Watson) – 2:48
 "The Old Man Below" (Carlton, Watson) – 2:07
 "Katie Morey" (Traditional) – 2:25
 "F. F.V." (Annie Watson, Watson) – 4:04
 "A-Rovin' on a Winter's Night" (Dolly Greer, Watson) – 3:25
 "Dill Pickle Rag" (Traditional) – 1:26
 "Sing Song Kitty" (Traditional) – 2:19
 "Froggie Went A-Courtin'" (Traditional) – 4:07
 "Pretty Saro" (Traditional) – 2:45
 "Childhood Play" (Alfred G. Karnes) – 2:00
 "Rain Crow Bill" (Henry Whitter) – 1:47
 "Matty Groves" (Dolly Greer, Doc Watson, Stewart Yonce) – 6:07
 "Victory Rag" (Maybelle Carter) – 1:44

Personnel
Doc Watson – guitar, 12-string guitar on track #7, vocals, banjo, harmonica solo track #12
Merle Watson – guitar
Russ Savakus – bass

References

1966 albums
Doc Watson albums
Vanguard Records albums